The Phu Phan Formation is an Early Cretaceous (Barremian to Aptian) geologic formation in Thailand. Fossil theropod tracks have been reported from the formation.

See also 
 List of dinosaur-bearing rock formations
 List of stratigraphic units with theropod tracks

References

Bibliography 
  

Geologic formations of Thailand
Lower Cretaceous Series of Asia
Cretaceous Thailand
Aptian Stage
Barremian Stage
Sandstone formations
Ichnofossiliferous formations
Paleontology in Thailand